This is a bibliography of renewable energy.

Renewable energy is energy which comes from natural resources such as sunlight, wind, rain, tides, and geothermal heat, which are renewable (naturally replenished). About 16% of global final energy consumption comes from renewables, with 10% coming from traditional biomass, which is mainly used for heating, and 3.4% from hydroelectricity. New renewables (small hydro, modern biomass, wind, solar, geothermal, and biofuels) account for another 3% and are growing very rapidly.

Total investment in renewable energy reached $244 billion in 2012. The top countries for investment in recent years were China, Germany, Spain, the United States, Italy, and Brazil. Leading renewable energy companies include BrightSource Energy, Enercon, First Solar, Gamesa, GE Energy, Goldwind, Nordex, Sinovel, Suntech, Trina Solar, Vestas and Yingli.

List
Alternative Energy: Political, Economic, and Social Feasibility
Clean Tech Nation: How the U.S. Can Lead in the New Global Economy (2012) by Ron Pernick and Clint Wilder
The Clean Tech Revolution
Climate Change and Global Energy Security
Deploying Renewables 2011 (2011) by the International Energy Agency
Energy and American Society: Thirteen Myths
Energy Autonomy: The Economic, Social & Technological Case for Renewable Energy
Energy for a Sustainable World – From the Oil Age to a Sun-Powered Future
The Energy Imperative: 100 Percent Renewable Now
Energy Victory: Winning the War on Terror by Breaking Free of Oil
The Fourth Revolution: Energy
Green Illusions: The Dirty Secrets of Clean Energy and the Future of Environmentalism
Greenhouse Solutions with Sustainable Energy
Harnessing Solar Heat
Kick The Fossil Fuel Habit
Non-Nuclear Futures: The Case for an Ethical Energy Strategy
Outlook On Renewable Energy In America
Powering Planet Earth – Energy Solutions for the Future
Reinventing Fire: Bold Business Solutions for the New Energy Era (2011) by Amory Lovins
Renewable Electricity and the Grid
Renewable Energy Sources and Climate Change Mitigation (2011) by the IPCC
Renewable Energy Systems: A Smart Energy Systems Approach to the Choice and Modeling of 100 % Renewable Solutions
Renewable energy. Technology, economics and environment
Small is Profitable: The Hidden Economic Benefits of Making Electrical Resources the Right Size
Solar Electricity Handbook IPCC
Solar Energy Perspectives (2011) by the International Energy Agency
The Solar Generation (2018) by Philip R Wolfe
Straight Up
Surviving the Century: Facing Climate Chaos and Other Global Challenges
Sustainable Energy - Without the Hot Air
Ten Technologies to Fix Energy and Climate
Understanding Renewable Energy Systems
What Will Work: Fighting Climate Change with Renewable Energy, Not Nuclear Power

See also
Academic journals
 Energy & Environment
 Energy Policy
 Journal of Renewable and Sustainable Energy
 Renewable and Sustainable Energy Reviews
 Renewable Energy
 Solar Energy Journal

Other
 List of films about renewable energy

Notes

References

 Book of Solar Power Systems Design: From the Sun into Electricity website

Books
Lists of technical books
Bibliographies of industry
 
 Books